Olive Green, Ohio may refer to:
Olive Green, Delaware County, Ohio
Olive Green, Noble County, Ohio